Ottesen is a surname. Notable people with the surname include:

Camilla Ottesen (born 1972), Danish television presenter
Carl Ottesen (1918–1972), Danish actor, screenwriter and film director
Elise Ottesen-Jensen (1886–1973), Norwegian-Swedish sex educator, journalist and anarchist agitator
Jacob Aaal Ottesen Preus III (born 1954), former president of Concordia University in Irvine, California
Jacob Aall Ottesen Preus (1883–1961), American politician
Jacob Aall Ottesen Preus II (1920–1994), Lutheran pastor, professor, author, and church president
Jakob Aall Ottesen Larsen (1888–1974), an American classical scholar
Marian Saastad Ottesen (born 1975), Norwegian actress
Janove Ottesen (born 1975), Norwegian musician
Jeanette Ottesen (born 1987), Danish swimmer
Lasse Ottesen (born 1974), Norwegian former ski jumper
Realf Ottesen Brandt (1859–1927), American Lutheran minister
Sölvi Ottesen (born 1984), Icelandic footballer
Tyge Ottesen Brahe (1546–1601), Danish nobleman known for his accurate and comprehensive astronomical and planetary observations

Danish-language surnames
Norwegian-language surnames